The spectral dimension is a real-valued quantity that characterizes a spacetime geometry and topology. It characterizes a spread into space over time, e.g. a ink drop diffusing in a water glass or the evolution of a pandemic in a population. The spectral dimension depends on the topology of the space, e.g., the distribution of neighbors in a population, and the diffusion rate. 

In physics, the concept of spectral dimension is used, among other things, in 
quantum gravity, 
percolation theory, 
superstring theory, or 
quantum field theory.

Examples

Other usage of the term

The term spectral dimension is also used to denote the dimension of the variable in a spectral analysis, therefore it is in that case typically synonymous with the frequency dimension, as in, e.g., the sentence "small instrumental shifts in the spectral dimension" from the wikipedia page on Data binning), or in "where x and y represent two spatial dimensions of the scene, and λ represents the spectral dimension (comprising a range of wavelengths)" from the wikipedia page on Hyperspectral imaging.

See also
Dimension
Fractal dimension
Hausdorff dimension

References 

Geometry
Diffusion
Quantum gravity
Power laws